The 2014 Liga Nusantara Riau Islands season is the first edition of Liga Nusantara Riau Islands is a qualifying round of the 2014 Liga Nusantara.

The competition scheduled starts in May 2014.

Teams
This season there are 9 to 10 Riau Islands club participants.

Registered club last season in the third division competition was Erdeka Muda FC, Putra Kundur, YSK 757 Karimun, PS Kota Tanjungpinang, PSTS Tanjungpinang, PS Bintan and Persidas Dabosingkep, while those registered in the second division is PS Batam and PS Karimun.

League table
Divided into one group, first places qualify for the 2014 Liga Nusantara.

Result

References

Riau Islands